Jacson Glei da Silva Clemente (born 13 March 1996), commonly known as Jacson, is a Brazilian professional  footballer, who last played for Langsning F.C. in the I-League 2nd Division.

Career statistics

Club

Notes

References

1993 births
Living people
Brazilian footballers
Association football forwards
Sport Club Atibaia players
Club León footballers
Coras de Nayarit F.C. footballers